Loui - male name:
 Loui Eriksson
 Loui Batley

and surname:
 Ronald Loui

See also 
 Louis (disambiguation)
 Louie (disambiguation)